Helcystogramma trijunctum is a moth in the family Gelechiidae. It is found in China (Anhui, Gansu, Guangxi, Guizhou, Hubei, Hunan, Shaanxi, Sichuan, Yunnan) and Taiwan.

The length of the forewings is 6-6.5 mm. The forewings have a fuscous fascia from the base to halfway the length of the anterior margin. There is a large, triangular costal blotch nearly connected to the fuscous fascia arising from the posterior margin at one-fourth the length and the postmedian line is incurved, dark brown beyond it. There is also a well—developed blackish tuft beyond the cell on the fold near the middle, other smaller ones near the middle and end of the cell.

References

Moths described in 1934
trijunctum
Moths of Asia
Moths of Taiwan